Commodores Christmas is a Christmas album released by The Commodores in 1992.

Track listing

References

1992 Christmas albums
Christmas albums by American artists
Contemporary R&B Christmas albums
Commodores albums